Iron Moon, also known as The Verse of us, is a 2015 Chinese feature documentary film directed by Xiaoyu Qin and Feiyue Wu. The documentary follows working class poets in China.

Awards

References

External links

2015 films
Chinese documentary films
2015 documentary films
China Film Group Corporation films